Peder Morset (4 April 1887 – 19 May 1943) was a Norwegian teacher and resistance member.

Born in Selbu in Sør-Trøndelag, Norway, he was the son of Ole Henriksen Morset (1864–1935) and Ingborg Berntine Petersdatter (1864–1947).
He was educated as a teacher and began his teaching career in his village. In 1913, Morset married Marit Stugudal (1893–1948). The couple had seven sons.

During the German occupation of Norway, Morset came into contact with a group organized by Henry Thingstad in Trondheim. Chairing the local chapter of the Norwegian Teachers' Union (Norges Lærerlag), he was also the local representative of the teachers' civil resistance.  Several of his sons were also deeply involved in the  resistance. Morset and his family helped refugees to flee to Sweden. However his resistance group was infiltrated by agents of Henry Rinnan  and Morset was arrested, sentenced to death and executed at Kristiansten Fortress in Trondheim in 1943. After the liberation, Morset was buried on 29 May 1945 along with the ashes of his son Niklas. The six surviving sons carried the coffin. The fate of Morset and his family was treated by journalist Per Hansson in his 1963 book – og tok de enn vårt liv .

References

Further reading
 (Oslo: Gyldendal) 

1887 births
1943 deaths
People from Selbu
Norwegian schoolteachers
Norwegian resistance members
Norwegian torture victims
Norwegian civilians killed in World War II
Executed Norwegian people
Norwegian people executed by Nazi Germany
Resistance members killed by Nazi Germany
Deaths by firearm in Norway